Artist Association of Pakistan is an association of artists in Pakistan. Artist Association of Pakistan also established Hunerkada College of Visual and Performing Arts as a fine arts college in Islamabad, Pakistan.

See also 
 Hunerkada College of Visual and Performing Arts
 Jamal Shah

External links
 Hunerkada College of Visual and Performing Arts

Cultural organisations based in Pakistan